Istiblennius is a genus of combtooth blennies found in the Pacific and Indian Oceans. The generic name is a compound noun composed of istio the Greek for "sail", referring to the high dorsal fin of the type species, Istiblennius muelleri, and blennius which is derived from a word for "mucus" and refers to the scaleless bodies that characterise the Blenniidae.

Species
The 14 currently recognized species in this genus are:
 Istiblennius bellus (Günther, 1861) (imspringer)
 Istiblennius colei (Herre, 1934)
 Istiblennius dussumieri (Valenciennes, 1836) (streaky rockskipper)
 Istiblennius edentulus (J. R. Forster & J. G. Schneider, 1801) (rippled rockskipper)
 Istiblennius flaviumbrinus (Rüppell, 1830)
 Istiblennius lineatus (Valenciennes, 1836) (lined rockskipper)
 Istiblennius meleagris (Valenciennes, 1836) (peacock rockskipper)
 Istiblennius muelleri (Klunzinger, 1879)
 Istiblennius pox V. G. Springer & J. T. Williams, 1994 (scarface rockskipper)
 Istiblennius rivulatus (Rüppell, 1830)
 Istiblennius spilotus V. G. Springer & J. T. Williams, 1994 (spotted rockskipper)
 Istiblennius steindachneri (Pfeffer, 1893)
 Istiblennius unicolor (Rüppell, 1838) (pallid rockskipper)
 Istiblennius zebra (Vaillant & Sauvage, 1875) (zebra blenny)

References

 
Salarinae
Taxa named by Gilbert Percy Whitley
Marine fish genera